The National Premier Leagues (NPL) is a men's national association football competition in Australia which acts as the second tier of the sport in the country below the A-League. The NPL consists of the highest level state league in each state-based federation within Australia. In total the NPL is contested by clubs from eight divisions; these are ACT, NSW, Northern NSW, Queensland, South Australia, Tasmania, Victoria and Western Australia. The NPL is overseen by Football Australia, in partnership with participating state-based member federations.

History 
In October 2010, Football Federation Australia (FFA) commenced a National Competition Review, its main objective being to review the current structure of soccer competitions in Australia, and to monitor and improve elite player development. By May 2012 the results of the National Competition Review were released. In it, a proposal to re-brand and revitalise state-based competitions in Australia.

On 13 February 2013, the establishment of the National Premier Leagues was announced. As a direct outcome of the National Competition Review, the league would rebrand the premier league in each state under a single banner. Originally named Australian Premier League but due to a violation of naming rights held by Lawn Bowls Australia the original name was scrapped and replaced with National Premier Leagues.

The inaugural season of the NPL began in March 2013. It included teams from five of the nine state-based federations: Football Queensland, Football NSW, Football Federation South Australia, Football Federation Tasmania, and Capital Football. The FFA member federations that did not join the NPL in 2013, Football West, Northern New South Wales Football and Football Federation Victoria joined in the 2014 season, with Football Federation Northern Territory expected to adopt a partial model at some time in the future. Although Victoria initially announced their teams would enter in 2014, a deferral was later announced in November 2013, after several clubs objected to the process for selecting teams. However, by December 2013, a resolution was reached whereby Victorian teams participated in the 2014 season.

FFA announced their intentions of a promotion and relegation structure between the first tier A-League and second tier working title Australian Championship from late 2022.

The finals series for the 2020 competition was cancelled on 3 July 2020 due to the COVID-19 pandemic in Australia.

National Second Division start from 2024 became second tier of soccer league in Australia and demote to third tier after announced on January 2023.

Competition format 

The NPL competitions in each state and territory are run by the member federation, with a national playoff tournament at the end of each season. Each member federation, or 'conference' contains various numbers of teams, and they play a full season with no inter-conference matches (an identical format to the individual State Leagues that preceded the NPL). The winner of each division is determined by the club in first position of each conference table at the end of the regular season, rather than the winner of the various state-based finals series.

NPL Finals Series 
At the completion of the regular home and away season, the winners of each respective Federation league compete in a finals playoff tournament.

The finals are all single match knock out matches. Between 2013–2015 the match ups were based on predetermined geographically adjacent Federations, with hosting rights for the quarter-finals alternating each year. From 2016 the match ups are determined by an open draw.  The hosts for the semi-finals and Grand Final are determined by a formula based on the time of winning of the previous NPL Finals matches (normal time, extra time or penalties), goals scored and allowed, and yellow/red cards.

The finals series culminates in a Grand Final, where the winner is crowned National Premier Leagues Champions.  Since the 2014 season, the NPL Champion has also qualified for the following years' FFA Cup round of 32.

Promotion and relegation 
Depending on the State Federation in charge, teams may be relegated from the NPL to a third-tier league in the same state (and vice versa), but there is currently no mechanism for a team to be promoted to the first tier of Australian Football, the A-League.  The number of teams promoted and relegated from third-tier leagues per state has varied over the existence of the NPL.  The table below details the number of teams relegated automatically from the NPL at the end of the season and the number of NPL teams which go into a relegation playoff against a lower league team (subject to those lower league teams meeting additional eligibility criteria to be able to be promoted to the NPL).

Current clubs (2023) 

Below are listed the National Premier Leagues clubs in each respective state member federation from the 2023 season.

In total, there are 94 clubs that compete in the top tier of the National Premier Leagues each season. Most NPL divisions involve promotion and relegation to leagues below the NPL and so participating clubs change annually.

Honours

NPL Finals

Clubs reaching the finals

Federation Premiers (Finalists) by season

Performance by Federation

Individual honours 
The John Kosmina Medal is presented to the best played in the NPL final and is named in honour of former Australian international John Kosmina.

See also 

 National Premier Leagues Women's
 Football Federation Australia
 Australian soccer league system
 National Second Division

Notes

References

External links 
 Official website

 
Football Australia
2
Recurring sporting events established in 2013
2013 establishments in Australia
Sports leagues established in 2013
Professional sports leagues in Australia
Aus